Agricultural engineering in the Soviet Union - Soviet machine building industry.

History 

 1855 - Andrei Terentyev artisans and Moses Creek created the first Russian threshing machine.
 1888 - Fyodor Blinov mechanic built the world's first model of crawler tractor.
 1893 - Yakov Mamin invented the plow with two plowshares
 1910 - Yakov Mamin created tractor "Dwarf", later known as the "Russian tractor" . However, mass production of tractors in Russia was launched only in the Soviet Union in the 20-30s.

In 1917 the whole of Russia was 165 tractors

 1918 - at Petrograd factory "Bolshevik" was organized small-scale production of crawler tractors.
 1921 - SNK (Soviet government) decree "On agricultural engineering".

At this time, the release of tractors engaged in Kolomna and Kharkiv Locomotive Factory, Obukhov plant. Most mass production of tractors was organized at the "Red Putilovets" (tractor "Fordson Putilovets").
 1926 - started producing tractor cultivators for continuous tillage .
 1928 - started production of tractor plows.

In 1928, the country produced 1,300 tractors
 1930 - commissioned in 1930 Stalingrad Tractor Factory design capacity of 144 tractors a day. Since that time, the Soviet Union began the mass production of tractors.

At "Communard" started production of the first Soviet harvesters.
 1931 - was built Kharkiv Tractor Plant.
 1932 - started production of tractor potato harvesters.
 1933 - was built Chelyabinsk Tractor Plant.
 1937 - USSR on the annual production of combine harvesters went to 1st place in the world - 44 thousand units. against 29 thousand in the U.S.

By the beginning of the Great Patriotic War, the Soviet Union occupied the first place in the world for the production of crawler tractors .

 During the war, many tractor factories were destroyed, some of them have relocated to the east of the country and produced for the front .
 1944 - resumed production of tractors.

After the war, the construction of new enterprises was continued.
 1946 - started production of the first tractor with a closed cabin S-80
 1947 - started production of the first self-propelled combine harvester S-4.
 1948 - Minsk Tractor Works started production of the first Soviet skidder KT-12.
 1956 - started production of the first industrial tractor S-100
 1957 - started production of the first Soviet high-power industrial tractor diesel-electric drive DET-250 .
 1960 - Soviet Union won first place in the world to produce tractors .
 1975 - came the first Soviet tractor with front cabin-industrial tractor-bulldozer T-330.

Tractor Plants in 1980

Factories for the production of combines in 1980

 1983 - launched Europe's largest tractor, designed to work as a crawler dozer, T-800 full weight of 106 tons (without blade length - 7945 mm, with blade -12 400 mm, width without blade -4185 mm, Width -6000 mm blade height -4775 mm.).
 1991 - disintegration of the USSR, was part of factories abroad.
 2001 - state-owned company established Rosagroleasing for the program of state support for agricultural producers and support leasing program.
 2003 - was founded Concern Tractor plants, uniting the main Russian producers of tractors.

Manufacturers of tractors in Russia

As part of Concern "Tractor plants"

Other manufacturers of tractors

Factories of foreign companies

Manufacturers combines in Russia

See also 
 Forestry in Russia
 Agriculture in Russia

Links 
 The official website for Concern "Tractor plants"
 Official site of the Russian Association of Agricultural Machinery
 Official website of the Association of Test agricultural machinery and technology (AIST)
 Official website of the Association of Timber Engineering Roslesmash
 Beiye specialize in the supply mid range tractors

Industry in Russia
Industry in the Soviet Union